Julian Savulescu (born 22 December 1963) is an Australian philosopher and bioethicist of Romanian origins. He is Uehiro Chair in Practical Ethics at the University of Oxford, Fellow of St Cross College, Oxford, director of the Oxford Uehiro Centre for Practical Ethics, co-director of the Wellcome Centre for Ethics and Humanities. He is visiting professorial fellow in Biomedical Ethics at the Murdoch Children's Research Institute in Australia, and distinguished visiting professor in law at Melbourne University since 2017. He directs the Biomedical Ethics Research Group and is a member of the Centre for Ethics of Pediatric Genomics in Australia. He is a former editor and current board member of the Journal of Medical Ethics (2001–2004 and 2011–2018), which is ranked as the No.2 journal in bioethics worldwide by Google Scholar Metrics, as of 2022. In addition to his background in applied ethics and philosophy, he also has a background in medicine and neuroscience and completed his MBBS (Hons) and BMedSc at Monash University, graduating top of his class with 18 of 19 final year prizes in Medicine. He edits the Oxford University Press book series, the Uehiro Series in Practical Ethics.

He completed his PhD at Monash University, under the supervision of philosopher Peter Singer. His doctoral thesis was on good reasons to die and euthanasia. After graduating, he took a Menzies Foundation postdoctoral scholarship, supervised by Derek Parfit before returning to Australia. He established a group on the ethics of genetics at the Murdoch Children's Research Institute, Australia. In 2002, he took up the Uehiro Chair in Practical Ethics in Oxford. In 2003, he established the Oxford Uehiro Centre for Practical Ethics as director.

Awards 

Savulescu has a Doctoris Honoris Causa from the University of Bucharest (2014). He was awarded the ‘Thinker’ Award in the top 100 Australian Future Leaders (2009), and is a Monash University Distinguished Alumni (2009). He was ASMR Gold Medalist (2005).

In 2018, Savulescu and a team of co-authors were awarded the Daniel M. Wegner Theoretical Innovation Prize. This prize recognizes the author of an article or book chapter judged to provide the most innovative theoretical contribution to social/personality psychology within a given year. He was also shortlisted for the AHRC Medal for Leadership in Medical Humanities in 2018.

Procreative beneficence 
Savulescu coined the phrase procreative beneficence. It is the controversial putative moral obligation of parents in a position to select their children, for instance through preimplantation genetic diagnosis (PGD), to favor those expected to have the best life. An argument in favor of this principle is that traits (such as empathy, memory, etc.) are "all-purpose means" in the sense of being instrumental in realizing whatever life plans the child may come to have.

In some of his publications he has argued for the following:
that parents have a responsibility to select the best children they could have, given all of the relevant genetic information available to them, a principle that he extends to the use of in-vitro fertilization (IVF) and preimplantation genetic diagnoses (PGD) to determine the intelligence of embryos and possible children; and
that stem cell research is justifiable even if one accepts the view of the embryo as a person.

Savulescu also justifies the destruction of embryos and fetuses as a source of organs and tissue for transplantation to adults. In his abstract he argues, 
"The most publicly justifiable application of human cloning, if there is one at all, is to provide self-compatible cells or tissues for medical use, especially transplantation. Some have argued that this raises no new ethical issues above those raised by any form of embryo experimentation. I argue that this research is less morally problematic than other embryo research. Indeed, it is not merely morally permissible but morally required that we employ cloning to produce embryos or fetuses for the sake of providing cells, tissues or even organs for therapy, followed by abortion of the embryo or fetus." He argues that if it is permissible to destroy fetuses, for social reasons, or no reasons at all, it must be justifiable to destroy them to save lives.

Further, as editor of the Journal of Medical Ethics, he published, in 2012, an article by two Italian academics which stated that a new-born baby is effectively no different from a foetus, is not a "person" and, morally, could be killed at the decision of the parents etc. This article was published as part of a special double issue, 'Abortion, Infanticide, and Allowing Babies to Die'. The double issue included articles by Peter Singer, Michael Tooley, Jeff McMahan, C.A.J Coady, Leslie Francis, John Finnis, and others. In an editorial, Savulescu wrote: "The Journal aims in this issue to promote further and more extensive rational debate concerning this controversial and important topic by providing a range of arguments from a variety of perspectives. We have tried to be as inclusive as possible and provided a double issue to include as many as possible of the submissions we received. Infanticide is an important issue and one worthy of scholarly attention because it touches on an area of concern that few societies have had the courage to tackle honestly and openly: euthanasia. We hope that the papers in this issue will stimulate ethical reflection on practices of euthanasia that are occurring and its proper justification and limits." He also stated, "I am strongly opposed to the legalisation of infanticide along the lines discussed by Giubilini and Minerva."

Along with neuroethicist Guy Kahane, Savulescu's article "Brain Damage and the Moral Significance of Consciousness" appears to be the first mainstream publication to argue that increased evidence of consciousness in patients diagnosed with being in persistent vegetative state actually supports withdrawing or withholding care.

In 2009, Professor Savulescu presented a paper at the 'Festival of Dangerous Ideas,' held at the Sydney Opera House in October 2009, entitled "Unfit for Life: Genetically Enhance Humanity or Face Extinction," which can be seen on Vimeo. Savulescu argues that humanity is on the brink of disappearing in a metaphorical 'Bermuda Triangle' unless humans are willing to undergo 'moral enhancement'.

Reception 
Walter Veit has gone further than Savulescu and argued that because there is no intrinsic moral difference between 'creating' and 'choosing' a life, eugenics becomes a natural consequence of procreative beneficence. If parents have a moral obligation to create children likely to have the best possible life, they should prefer to have children that have been genetically engineered for an optimal chance at such a life, even if those children bear little or no genetic relation to them.

Rebecca Bennett, however, criticizes Savulescu's argument. Bennett argues that "the chances of any particular individual being born is spectacularly unlikely, given the infinite number of variables that had to be in place for this to happen. In order for any particular individual to exist, that individual's parents have to have been created in the first place, they have to meet at the right time and conceive us at a particular time to enable that particular sperm to fuse with that particular egg. Thus, it is clear that all sorts of things, any change in society, will effect who is born.". According to Bennett, this means that no-one is actually harmed if one does not select the best offspring, as the individuals born could not have had any other, worse life as they would otherwise never have been born – "choosing worthwhile but impaired lives harms no-one and is thus not less preferable", as Bennett puts it. Bennett argues that while advocates of procreative beneficence could appeal to impersonal harm, which is where one should aim to ensure the maximum possible potential quality of life and thus embryos without or with the least impairments should be selected (as the impersonal total quality of life will be improved), this argument is flawed on two counts. Firstly on an intuitive level, Bennett questions if benefit or harm that doesn't affect anyone (i.e. it is impersonal) should be worthy of consideration as no actual people will gain or lose anything. Secondly and on a theoretical level, Bennett argues that attempting to increase the sum total impersonal happiness (or decrease impersonal harm) can lead to repugnant conclusions, such as being obliged to produce as many offspring as possible to bring more people into the world to raise the level of impersonal happiness, even if the quality of life of individuals suffers for it due to scarcity and overcrowding. Bennett argues that this conclusion is repugnant because "it cares little about what we normally regard as morally important: the welfare of individual people".

Norbert Paulo criticised Savulescu's argument for moral enhancement, arguing that if democratic governments had to morally enhance their populations because the majoritarian population are morally deficient, they could not be legitimate as they manipulated the population's will. Thus in Paulo's view, those advocating large-scale, state-driven and partially mandatory moral enhancement are advocating a non-democratic order.

Other information 

In 2009, Savulescu was awarded a Distinguished Alumni Award by Monash University. In the same year, he was also announced as the winner in the Thinking category of The Australian newspaper's Emerging Leaders Awards.

He has co-authored two books: Medical Ethics and Law: The Core Curriculum with Tony Hope and Judith Hendrick and Unfit for the Future: The Need for Moral Enhancement (published by Oxford University Press) with Ingmar Persson.

Savulescu is a member of the board of directors executive committee of the International Neuroethics Society.

Together with John Harris, Julian was called a leading figure in New eugenics.

He has also edited the books Der neue Mensch? Enhancement und Genetik (together with Nikolaus Knoepffler), Human Enhancement (together with Nick Bostrom), Enhancing Human Capacities, The Ethics of Human Enhancement. He was also a co-author of Love Is the Drug: The Chemical Future of Our Relationships addressing the future potential widespread use of aphrodisiacs. In it, he argued, that certain forms of medications can be ethically consumed as a "helpful complement" in relationships. Both to fall in love, and, to fall out of it.

See also

Bioethics
Biopolitics
Designer baby
Human enhancement
Human genetic engineering
Morphological freedom
Procreative liberty
Reproductive rights
Reprogenetics
Techno-progressivism
Transhumanism

References

External links

The Oxford Uehiro Centre for Practical Ethics.
The Hinxton Group: An International Consortium on Stem Cells, Ethics & Law.
Stronger, smarter, nicer humans.
Philosophy Bites podcast of Julian Savulescu interviewed by Nigel Warburton on the Yuk Factor.

1963 births
Living people
20th-century Australian philosophers
21st-century Australian philosophers
Australian people of Romanian descent
Australian transhumanists
Bioethicists
Fellows of St Cross College, Oxford
People educated at Haileybury (Melbourne)
Monash University alumni